Cedar Vale is a city in Chautauqua County, Kansas, United States.  As of the 2020 census, the population of the city was 476.

History
Cedar Vale was founded in 1870. Its name is meant to be descriptive of the town's setting.

Geography
Cedar Vale is located at  (37.104892, -96.500844).

Climate
The climate in this area is characterized by hot, humid summers and generally mild to cool winters.  According to the Köppen Climate Classification system, Cedar Vale has a humid subtropical climate, abbreviated "Cfa" on climate maps.

Demographics

2010 census
As of the census of 2010, there were 579 people, 251 households, and 144 families living in the city. The racial makeup of the city was 91.5% White, 0.3% African American, 3.5% Native American, 0.2% Asian, and 4.5% from two or more races. Hispanic or Latino of any race were 1.9% of the population.

There were 251 households, of which 30.7% had children under the age of 18 living with them, 41.8% were married couples living together, 10.8% had a female householder with no husband present, 4.8% had a male householder with no wife present, and 42.6% were non-families. 37.8% of all households were made up of individuals, and 19.2% had someone living alone who was 65 years of age or older. The average household size was 2.27 and the average family size was 2.98.

The median age in the city was 43.9 years. 25.4% of residents were under the age of 18; 7.3% were between the ages of 18 and 24; 18.1% were from 25 to 44; 27.2% were from 45 to 64; and 22.1% were 65 years of age or older. The gender makeup of the city was 50.3% male and 49.7% female.

2000 census
As of the census of 2000, there were 723 people, 285 households, and 184 families living in the city. The racial makeup of the city was 92.67% White, 0.41% African American, 4.15% Native American, 1.11% from other races, and 1.66% from two or more races. Hispanic or Latino of any race were 2.07% of the population.

There were 285 households, out of which 29.5% had children under the age of 18 living with them, 51.9% were married couples living together, 8.4% had a female householder with no husband present, and 35.1% were non-families. 33.3% of all households were made up of individuals, and 22.5% had someone living alone who was 65 years of age or older. The average household size was 2.29 and the average family size was 2.91.

In the city, the population was spread out, with 24.6% under the age of 18, 4.6% from 18 to 24, 18.3% from 25 to 44, 23.5% from 45 to 64, and 29.0% who were 65 years of age or older. The median age was 47 years. For every 100 females, there were 92.8 males. For every 100 females age 18 and over, there were 84.7 males.

The median income for a household in the city was $27,031, and the median income for a family was $33,889. Males had a median income of $24,167 versus $19,688 for females. The per capita income for the city was $14,410. About 11.1% of families and 14.7% of the population were below the poverty line, including 19.2% of those under age 18 and 14.5% of those age 65 or over.

Media
The Cedar Vale Star newspaper was created in 1884, and it continued until January 1894.

References

Further reading

External links
 City of Cedar Vale
 Cedar Vale - Directory of Public Officials
 USD 285, local school district
 Cedar Vale city map, KDOT

Cities in Kansas
Cities in Chautauqua County, Kansas